Colonel Sir Piers Henry George Bengough  (24 May 1929 – 18 April 2005) was Her Majesty's Representative at Ascot, in the Royal Household 1984–1997.

He was educated at Eton College and served in The Royal Hussars 1948–1973, retiring as a Lieutenant-Colonel (promoted to Colonel in 1984). He was Honorary Colonel 1983–1990, and was a member of the Honourable Corps of Gentlemen at Arms from 1981 (retiring in 1999), and died in 2005.

He was made a KCVO in 1986, and received the OBE in 1973. He was made a Deputy Lieutenant for the county of Hereford and Worcester on 29 June 1987. Bengough was named High Sheriff of Herefordshire for 2002.

He joined the Grand Military Race Committee in 1963 and was appointed Chairman in 1985 on the retirement of General Sir Cecil Blacker.  He stepped down as Chairman in 2004, being replaced by Brigadier Andrew Parker Bowles.

Bengough married former figure skater Bridget Adams in 1952.

References

1929 births
2005 deaths
People educated at Eton College
10th Royal Hussars officers
Deputy Lieutenants of Hereford and Worcester
Knights Commander of the Royal Victorian Order
Officers of the Order of the British Empire
Honourable Corps of Gentlemen at Arms
High Sheriffs of Herefordshire